The 25th (1st Württemberg) Dragoons “Queen Olga” (Dragoner-Regiment „Königin Olga“ (1. Württembergisches) Nr. 25) were a cavalry regiment of the Army of Württemberg. The regiment was originally formed in 1806 as Chevau-légers, but reorganized as dragoons in 1870. The regiment took part in the Franco-Prussian war and served with the 7th Cavalry Division in World War I.

On 1 May 1919 the regiment was disbanded, with the 1st Squadron/18th Horse bearing its tradition in the new Reichsheer.

See also
List of Imperial German cavalry regiments

References

Günther Voigt, Germany's Army Until 1918. Volume 7, Biblio Verlag, Osnabrück 1986, .
Hans-Joachim Harder: Military History Guide Baden-Württemberg. Published by the Military History Research Office. Kohlhammer Verlag, Stuttgart 1987, 
Regimental commander in 1906-08

Cavalry regiments of Germany
Regiments of the German Army in World War I
Military units and formations established in 1806
Military units and formations disestablished in 1919
1806 establishments in Germany

19th-century establishments in Württemberg
Dragoons